The S5.4 (AKA TDU-1, GRAU Index 8D66), was a Russian liquid rocket engine burning TG-02 and AK20F in the gas generator cycle. It was originally used as the braking (deorbit) engine of the Vostok, Voskhod, and Zenit spacecraft, which later switched to solid engines.

The engine produced  of thrust with a specific impulse of 266 seconds in vacuum, and burned for 45 seconds, enough for the deorbit. It had a main fixed combustion chamber and four small verniers to supply vector control. It was housed in the service module and had two toroidal tanks for pressurization.

It was designed by OKB-2, the Design Bureau led by Aleksei Isaev, for the Vostok program. The braking engine for the first manned spacecraft was a difficult task that no design bureau wanted to take. It was considered critical, as a failure would have left a cosmonaut stranded in space. A solid engine was considered, but the ballistic experts predicted a  landing error, versus a tenth of that for a liquid engine. It took the coordinated efforts of Boris Chertok and Sergei Korolev to convince Isaev to accept the task.

References

External links
 KB KhIMMASH Official Page (in Russian, Archived)

Rocket engines of Russia
Rocket engines of the Soviet Union
Rocket engines using hypergolic propellant